Parmenides was an ancient Greek philosopher born in Elea.

Parmenides may also refer to:

 6039 Parmenides, an outer main-belt asteroid
 Parmenides (dialogue), one of the dialogues of Plato
 Parmenides Foundation, a psychology organization